Mister World 1996 was the 1st edition of the Mister World competition. It was held on September 20, 1996 at the  Anadolu Auditorium in Istanbul, Turkey. Tom Nuyens of Belgium was crowned as the very first Mister World at the end of the event.

Results

Placements

Special Awards

Contestants

Judges
Bruce Forsyth
Ninibeth Leal
Wilnelia Merced
Eric Morley
Linda Pétursdóttir
Naim Süleymanoğlu
Ivana Trump

References

Mister World
1996 beauty pageants
1996 in Turkey
1990s in Istanbul
September 1996 events in Turkey
Beauty pageants in Turkey
Events in Istanbul